Life's Like That was a gag panel by Fred Neher which found humor in life's foibles. Spanning five decades -- from October 1, 1934 to August 20, 1977 —  the panel was initially distributed by Consolidated News Features, and later by the Bell-McClure Syndicate and the United Feature Syndicate.

At its peak, Life's Like That was published in 500 newspapers. The Sunday format gave several cartoons a free-floating grouping, with variations, including one arrangement similar to George Lichty's Grin and Bear It, displaying several square-shaped panels with one in a circle.

When Neher died at age 98 in Boulder, Colorado in 2001, Owen S. Good wrote in the Rocky Mountain News:

Publication history 
Neher had drawn a comic strip, Goofey Movies, for five years (1925-1930), plus sales of gag cartoons to 42 magazines, including Collier's and The New Yorker, when the Bell Syndicate signed him on in 1934.

Life's Like That was launched October 1, 1934, and ran until 1941 but disappeared from newspapers during World War II. As the war concluded, it returned by June 1945, running until 1977, when Neher retired. He stopped doing the Sunday half-page in October 1972.

Doug Sweet, of The Montreal Gazette, recalled that his newspaper ran Life's Like That when it carried no other syndicated gag panels or comic strips:

Archives

During the 1950s and 1960s, Neher taught cartooning at the University of Colorado for 12 years, and he donated his Life's Like That cartoons to the University of Colorado Library Archives (where they fill 36 linear feet). As he described it, "Univ. of Colo. ask to have all my original drawings for safe keeping ... came in a truck and left me only my shorts."

References

External links
Syracuse University: Fred Neher Papers
Punch in Canada: Comic Art of Arch Dale

American comic strips
Comic strips set in the United States
1934 comics debuts
1977 comics endings
Gag cartoon comics
Gag-a-day comics
Slice of life comics